Mühlgraben is a town in the district of Jennersdorf in the Austrian state of Burgenland.

Population

References

Cities and towns in Jennersdorf District
Slovenian communities in Burgenland